Ahipara is a town and locality in Northland, New Zealand at the southern end of Ninety Mile Beach, with the Tauroa Peninsula to the west and Herekino Forest to the east. Ahipara Bay is to the north west. Kaitaia is 14 km to the north east, and Pukepoto is between the two.

History

Pre-European settlement

The name comes from the Māori language words ahi, meaning fire, and para, a large fern, and can be translated as "a fire at which para was cooked". Prior to the late 18th century, the area was called Wharo, which means "stretched out". That name originated when the chief Tohe ordered a slave to measure the distance the tide had receded, by counting the number of arm-spans from the high water level.

European settlement

The area was popular with kauri gum-diggers during the late 19th and early 20th centuries. By the 1910s, the kauri gum industry became centred around Ahipara and Houhora. Digging peaked at Ahipara in the 1920s and 1930s, and the area was one of the last places in New Zealand where kauri gum was dug on a widescale. The Ahipara Gumfields Historic Reserve is to the south of the town.

Shipwreck Bay (Te Kōhanga in Māori), at the southern point of Ahipara Bay, contains a number of wrecks visible at low tide.

Ahipara Bay was once well known for its toheroa shellfish, but gathering these is restricted due to their near-extinction.

21st century
In February 2019, a fire occurred early morning in Ahipara near Shipwreck Bay (Te Kohanga). Fire alarms were raised at 1:24am evacuating six homes on Gumfields Road.

In early October 2020, another fire occurred in Ahipara near the southern end of Ninety Beach, causing the evacuation of four homes on 4 October.

Demographics

Ahipara had a population of 1,230 at the 2018 New Zealand census, an increase of 198 people (19.2%) since the 2013 census, and an increase of 135 people (12.3%) since the 2006 census. There were 390 households, comprising 597 males and 636 females, giving a sex ratio of 0.94 males per female. The median age was 41.4 years (compared with 37.4 years nationally), with 270 people (22.0%) aged under 15 years, 204 (16.6%) aged 15 to 29, 564 (45.9%) aged 30 to 64, and 195 (15.9%) aged 65 or older.

Ethnicities were 60.7% European/Pākehā, 61.2% Māori, 5.9% Pacific peoples, 2.0% Asian, and 2.2% other ethnicities. People may identify with more than one ethnicity.

The percentage of people born overseas was 12.0, compared with 27.1% nationally.

Of those people who chose to answer the census's question about religious affiliation, 40.7% had no religion, 45.9% were Christian, 5.6% had Māori religious beliefs, 0.7% were Hindu, 0.2% were Muslim, 0.5% were Buddhist and 1.2% had other religions.

Of those at least 15 years old, 156 (16.2%) people had a bachelor or higher degree, and 180 (18.8%) people had no formal qualifications. The median income was $23,600, compared with $31,800 nationally. 102 people (10.6%) earned over $70,000 compared to 17.2% nationally. The employment status of those at least 15 was that 381 (39.7%) people were employed full-time, 147 (15.3%) were part-time, and 78 (8.1%) were unemployed.

Iwi, Marae & Hapū

Ahipara is located within the rohe (tribal area) of Te Rarawa, and has strong affiliations to the iwi.

Ahipara hosts three marae affiliated with Te Rarawa hapū:

 Korou Kore Marae: Affiliated with the hapū Ngāti Moroki. The whare tūpuna is also named Ngāti Moroki.
 Roma Marae: Affiliated with four hapū: Ngāti Pākahi, Ngāti Waiora, Parewhero and Te Patukirikiri. The whare tūpuna is named Te Ōhākī. In October 2020, the Government committed $1,407,731 from the Provincial Growth Fund to upgrade Roma Marae and 8 other marae of Te Rarawa, creating 100 jobs.
 Wainui Marae: Also called Ngāti Moetonga Marae, is affiliated with two hapū: Ngāti Moetonga and Te Rokeka. The whare tūpuna is also named Ngāti Moetonga.

Recreation 

Ahipara and Shipwreck Bays are popular surfing spots. The area featured in the 1966 surf movie The Endless Summer. Shipwreck Bay has been reported as one of the best left hand surf breaks in the world.

Ahipara is on the walking trail Te Araroa.

Education

Ahipara School is a coeducational full primary (years 1–8) school with a decile rating of 3 and a roll of 227. It was founded in 1872 as a mission school, and moved to its present site in 1901.

Ahipara Sandhoppers Early Childhood Centre has been operating on the grounds of the Ahipara School for over 20 years. Ahipara Sandhoppers has received recognition for their environmental initiatives.

Environment 
Ahipara has a number of coastal care groups, including the Ahipara Komiti Takutaimoana (for present and future sustainable use and protection of the Kaimoana/seafood) and Ahipara Community CoastCare (protection and restoration of the dune environment).

References

External links

 Official website 
 Ahipara School school website
 Ahipara and Shipwreck Bay
Ahipara beach at Kaka Street - recreational water quality, Land Air Water Aotearoa
Ahipara - historic images and articles, National Library of New Zealand
Natural areas of Ahipara Ecological District Report, New Zealand Department of Conservation

Far North District
Populated places in the Northland Region